Gravity is a 2013 science-fiction thriller film directed, co-produced, co-written, and co-edited by Alfonso Cuarón. The film's musical score was composed by Steven Price, with the cinematography provided by Cuarón's longtime collaborator, Emmanuel Lubezki. The film stars Sandra Bullock and George Clooney as astronauts involved in the mid-orbit destruction of a Space Shuttle and their attempt to return to Earth.

Gravity premiered at the 70th Venice International Film Festival on August 28, 2013 where it won the Future Film Festival Digital Award. The film then received a wide release at over 3,500 theaters in the United States and Canada on October 4, 2013 by Warner Bros. On its opening weekend, it grossed over $55 million which broke the North American opening weekend record for the month of October. Gravity grossed a worldwide total of over $723 million on a budget of $100 million. As of 2019, it is Clooney's highest-grossing film to date. Rotten Tomatoes, a review aggregator, surveyed 345 reviews and judged 96 percent to be positive.

Gravity garnered awards and nominations in a variety of categories with particular praise for its direction, cinematography, score, and visual effects. The film received 10 nominations at the 86th Academy Awards, the most nominations of 2014's ceremony tied with American Hustle. It went on to earn the most awards at the ceremony, winning seven including Best Director for Cuarón, Best Cinematography for Lubezki, Best Original Score for Price, and Best Visual Effects. The film received four nominations at the 71st Golden Globe Awards, with Cuarón winning for Best Director. Gravity led the nominations at the 67th British Academy Film Awards with eleven nominations. The film won six awards, the most at the ceremony, including Outstanding British Film, Best Director for Cuarón, Best Cinematography for Lubezki, Best Original Music for Price, and Best Visual Effects.

At the Producers Guild Awards, Gravity tied for Best Theatrical Motion Picture with 12 Years a Slave. Cuarón received the Best Director award from the Directors Guild of America and Bullock was also nominated for Best Actress at the Screen Actors Guild Awards. At the 40th Saturn Awards, Gravity joint-led the nominations with The Hobbit: The Desolation of Smaug, both films receiving eight nominations. The film went on to win five Saturn Awards including Best Science Fiction Film, Best Director for Cuarón and Best Actress for Bullock. The film's visual effects were acclaimed by the Visual Effects Society, which gave the film six awards including their top award for Outstanding Visual Effects in an Effects Driven Film. Both the American Film Institute and National Board of Review  included the film in their list of top ten films of 2013.

Accolades 

 Each date is linked to the article about the awards held that year wherever possible.

See also 
2013 in film

References

External links 
 

Lists of accolades by film